Paras Ram Bhardwaj (1 October 1948 – 19 October 2015) was an Indian politician and a member of the 12th Lok Sabha representing Sarangarh (Lok Sabha constituency) of Madhya Pradesh State till 2000 and from Chhattisgarh State later.

He was elected as a member of the 7th, 8th, 9th, 10th and 11th Lok Sabha of India Parliament.

Parasram Bhardwaj died on 19 October 2015 died due to cardiac arrest.

References

External links

1948 births
India MPs 1980–1984
India MPs 1984–1989
India MPs 1989–1991
India MPs 1991–1996
India MPs 1996–1997
India MPs 1998–1999
People from Bilaspur district, Chhattisgarh
Lok Sabha members from Madhya Pradesh
Lok Sabha members from Chhattisgarh
Living people
Indian National Congress politicians from Chhattisgarh